Milton Lee Olive III (November 7, 1946 – October 22, 1965) was a United States Army soldier and a recipient of America's highest military decoration — the Medal of Honor — for his actions in the Vietnam War.  At the age of 18, Olive sacrificed his life to save others by falling on a grenade.  He was the first African-American recipient of the Medal of Honor from the Vietnam War.

Biography

Olive joined the Army from his birth city of Chicago, Illinois in 1964, and by 1965 was serving as a Private First Class in Company B of the 2nd Battalion (Airborne), 503rd Infantry Regiment, 173rd Airborne Brigade in Vietnam. On October 22, 1965, while moving through the jungle with four fellow soldiers in Phu Cuong, Olive sacrificed his life by smothering an enemy-thrown grenade with his body. For his actions on that day, he was posthumously awarded the Medal of Honor.

At a ceremony on the steps of the White House, on April 21, 1966, President Lyndon B. Johnson presented Olive's Medal of Honor to his father and stepmother. Also in attendance were two of the four men whose lives were saved by Olive's actions.

Olive's body was returned to the United States and buried in West Grove Cemetery at Lexington, Holmes County, Mississippi.
Olive was born in Chicago but left as a young boy living in Lexington, Mississippi where he finished high school.

Tributes

In 1966 a plaque and park was dedicated in his honor. In 1999, the city of Chicago recognized Olive by naming Olive Park on Lake Michigan in his honor. Olive-Harvey College, one of the City Colleges of Chicago, is named after both Olive and fellow Medal of Honor recipient Carmel Bernon Harvey Jr.  The Milton L. Olive Middle School in Wyandanch, Long Island, New York, is also named in his honor.
In 2007, a State Historical Marker was erected for Olive in Lexington, Mississippi. The dedication ceremonies included an address by the Adjutant General of the Mississippi National Guard. Fort Campbell has a recreation facility named in his honor. In 2012, Fort Benning, GA dedicated a Simulations facility in his honor named Olive Hall (The Maneuver Battle Lab).

Honor Field is a one-mile track located in Ft. Polk LA that bears a plaque detailing Olives heroics. The field is used for everything from changes of command and physical training to tests of physical fortitude in various military competitions.

The Downlow Saga, a 2017 novel by Los Angeles author Sheldon McCormick, is dedicated in memory of PFC Olive.

His statue, along with Sgt. William Harvey Carney, is seen on the African-American Medal of Honor Recipients Memorial in Wilmington, Delaware.

In the 2020 Spike Lee film Da 5 Bloods, Olive is briefly mentioned during a conversation about portrayals of war in Hollywood, with the character Otis wishing for the portrayals of more black war heroes like Olive.

Medal of Honor citation

See also

 List of African-American Medal of Honor recipients
 List of Medal of Honor recipients
 List of Medal of Honor recipients for the Vietnam War
 Military history of African Americans in the Vietnam War

Notes

References

External links

 
https://commons.wikimedia.org/wiki/File:Milton_L._Olive_III_plaque_detailing_his_heroic_actions_in_WW_2.jpg

1946 births
1965 deaths
African-American United States Army personnel
American military personnel killed in the Vietnam War
United States Army Medal of Honor recipients
Military personnel from Chicago
United States Army soldiers
Vietnam War recipients of the Medal of Honor
People from Lexington, Mississippi
Military personnel from Mississippi
Deaths by hand grenade
United States Army personnel of the Vietnam War
African Americans in the Vietnam War